Anja Mihr (born 1969) is a German political scientist and human rights researcher. She works in the areas of Transitional Justice, Cyber Justice, Climate Justice, Governance and Human Rights Regimes. She is an internationally known academic who has taught in various universities in Germany, the United States, Italy, China and the Netherlands. Her main work focuses on human rights, governance and transitional justice, looking at the interlinkage between institutions, organizations and the way human rights realization can be leveraged.

Anja Mihr has also served in various international academic and NGO advisory committees on human rights. From 2002 to 2006 she was a member of the Executive Board of Amnesty International Germany.

Career
Anja Mihr is the founder and director of the Center on Governance through Human Rights at the Berlin Governance Platform. Since 2018, Mihr is DAAD Associate Professor for Human Rights, Democratization, International Relations, Transitional Justice, at the OSCE Academy in Bishkek, Kyrgyzstan. Her recent works include studies on Glocal Governance. She is a political consultant and advisor on Transitional Justice, Cyber Justice, and Climate Justice, and has held various professorships in this field. She has been Professor for Public Policy at the Willy Brandt School of Public Policy at Erfurt University in Germany, and Associate Professor at the Netherlands Institute of Human Rights (SIM) at Utrecht University in the Netherlands. She has held numerous other positions at think tanks, such as Head of Rule of Law at The Hague Institute for Global Justice and at internationally known academic institutions such as Peking University (Beida) in Beijing, the European Inter-University Center for Human Rights and Democratization (EIUC) in Venice, Columbia University in New York or Humboldt University in Berlin. Mihr's interdisciplinary background has focused on combining concepts of social sciences and international human rights law in her research and publications.

She graduated from Free University in Berlin. Her doctoral thesis on the Impact of Amnesty International's human rights work in the GDR (East Germany) during the period of the Cold War until 1989 was published in 2001.

Mihr was appointed as member of the Scientific Committee of the EU Fundamental Rights Agency (FRA) from 2018 -2023.

Theory of Political Regime Consolidation through Transitional Justice 
In Mihr's 2017 (2019) book on 'Regime Consolidation and Transitional Justice', she develops a theory to explain the impact of Transitional Justice measures in the context of political regime consolidations.  For example, vetting and lustration processes, trials, compensations and reparations, amnesties impact the way a political system changes and consolidates. The core essence of this theory is to explain, how after a radical rupture or war, the new political system and its actors are able and willing to implement measures that allow political institutions and actors to democratically progress and increase their quality of democracy, or not.

According to Mihr, a political system/regime develops backward toward autocracy if TJ measures are applied exclusively.  But a democratic system can progress and consolidate when TJ measures are applied in an inclusive manner and effort, in the first 10 to 20 years of system transition and transformation. 

Therefore, whether a political regime consolidates democratically or autocratically, depends on how political actors during this process are willing or capable to put blame on all sides when dealing with the past or not.

Furthermore, the case studies on Turkey, Germany, and Spain illustrate, how over one and two generations after regime change, Transitional Justice measures mutually reinforce themselves, both in a downward (autocratic) spiral, as the example Turkey and East Germany show, as well as an upward (democratic) spiral as illustrated by the cases of West-Germany and Spain, depending on how exclusive or inclusive they are applied by civil society, victim and victimizers, governments and other formal and informal sectors of society.

Analytical Framework of Glocal Governance 
In her works in glocal governance (Glocal Governance in the Anthropocene, 2022), Mihr develops an analytical framework to assess how local actors and institutions implement global and international norms in order to govern effectively, without the interference of state authorities or governments. 

She argues that over the past decades, the dramatic dissemination and the universal acknowledgment of international norms, such as human rights, health, and trade standards, are directly implemented on local and community levels, as seen during the Covid-19 Pandemic since 2020. Mihr argues that the pandemic has pushed global, national and local actors to a glocal twist in their response. Local business, civil society, and city counselors adhere to and apply global trade and taxation laws, health, and education standards. They implement and materialize international labor laws, empower women, protect children's rights and practice multi-stakeholder participation standards. Therefore, glocalization and privatization of public sectors have eroded territorial Nation-State in almost all public policy matters such as security, health, education, and political economy. Due to the power gap that eroded Statehood has left behind on all levels of government, glocal governance replaces weak, defect or corrupt governmental structures.

Publications 
 Glocal Governance - How to govern in the Anthropocene?, 2022, SpringerLink for Political Sciences, Open Access
 Between Peace and Conflict in the East and West, Studies on Transformation and Development in the OSCE Region, (Chief Editor), Springer & Palgrave Macmillan, 2021
 Transformation and Developments in the OSCE Region, (Chief Editor), Springer & Palgrave Macmillan, 2020
 Regime Consolidation and Transitional Justice, Comparative Case Studies of Germany, Spain and Turkey, Cambridge University Press, 2017 (paperback 2019).
 Cyber Justice: Human Rights and Good Governance for the Internet, Springer Briefs, Springer Verlag, 2017 (E-book)
Climate Change, Migration and Human Rights, Law and Policy Perspectives, (co-editor: Manou, Cubie, Baldwin, Torp) (eds.) Routledge Studies in Environmental Migration, Displacement and Resettlement, Routledge, Francis & Tayler, 2017
Mihr/Gibney: Handbook of Human Rights, 2 vol. SAGE Publication, London et al., 2014 
 The SAGE Handbook of Human Rights (2 Volumes) 2014
 The Impact of Amnesty International's Policies and Campaigns During the Cold War – the Case Study of East Germany, in: Wilco de Jonge, Brianne McGonigle-Leyh, Anja Mihr and Lars van Troost (eds.), 50 Years of Amnesty International, Reflections and Perspectives, SIM Special 36, University of Utrecht, 2011, pp. 21–50.
 Human Rights in the 21st Century; Continuity and Change since 9/11 (together with Goodhart) (eds.), Palgrave Macmillan, 2011
 The UN-Decade for Human Rights Education and the Inclusion of National Minorities, (together with Mahler/Toivanen) (eds.), Peter Lang Verlag, Frankfurt/ Berlin, 2009.
 Human Rights Awareness, Education and Democratization: The challenge for the 21st Century, in: Journal of Human Rights, Volume 8, Issue 2, April 2009, Routledge, Francis & Taylor Group, London, pp. 177–189.
 Amnesty International in der DDR, Der Einsatz für Menschenrechte im Visier der Stasi, Chrs. Links Verlag, Berlin, 2002.

Studies and Clips 
MOOC on Transitology, Pathways to and from Democracy
What is Social Justice?
What is shared responsibility?
What are ‘Digital Rights’?
What is Climate Justice?
What is a Decision Making Process?
What is civic participation?
What are Gender Specific Rights?
How to create an Inclusive Society?
What is justice?
Do you know human rights?
Rechtsstaat ist keine Einbahnstraße, Peace Lab-Rechtsstaatförderung, Bundesregierung, RSF Hub, Free University Berlin, April 2019 
The Glasshouse of the Cyberworld, The Indian Economist, India, July 2016
NGOs in Conflict Transition, for The Global South Unit for Mediation, Brazil, July 2016
Die schwierige Aufarbeitung von Menschenrechtsverletzung, Feature and Interview in German Broadcast (Deutschlandfunk) February 2016
Rule of Law, security and transitional justice in fragile and conflict affected states, (together with C.L. Sriram) Background Papers, Commission on Global Security, Justice & Governance, The Hague Institute for Global Justice & Stimson Institute, Washington DC August 2015
 Public Privacy, Human Rights in Cyberspace, SIM Working Paper, Utrecht University, December 2013
 Rule of Law and Transitional Justice. Towards a triangular learning. The case of Colombia GIZ-EIUC Publication, September 2013.
 Public Privacy- Cyber Security & Human Rights, Massive Open Online Course for iversity.org, December 2013.
 The misunderstanding: Human rights are recognized equally in Europe and Asia – but implemented differently. An essay. March 2013.
 Transitional Justice and the Quality of Democracy – From Democratic Institution Building to Reconciliation, 2013
 Human Rights Benchmarks for EU's External Policy, DROI, European (EU) Parliament, Directorate-General for External Policies, Political Department, 2011, EXPO/B/DROI/2011/15

References

External links
 
 Official Instagram account

1969 births
Living people
[[Category:German political scientists]]
Free University of Berlin alumni
German human rights activists
Women human rights activists
Women political scientists